Rui Xu (born 1989 in Switzerland) is a state representative in the Kansas House of Representatives, representing the 25th district. He is the first Chinese-American person to ever serve in the Kansas Legislature and the only naturalized citizen and only Asian-American currently serving.

Political career 
Rui was elected to the Kansas House of Representatives for the first time in 2018. He is a member of the Democratic Party (United States).

2019-2020 Kansas House Committee Assignments 
Agriculture
Education (2019) 
Higher Education Budget (2020)
Financial Institutions and Pensions

References 

1989 births
Living people
21st-century American politicians
Asian-American people in Kansas politics
American politicians of Chinese descent
Democratic Party members of the Kansas House of Representatives
Naturalized citizens of the United States